Francis Joseph Hurren (2 February 1894 – 5 July 1963) was an Australian rules footballer for  in the Victorian Football League (VFL).

He played his final VFL match in 1915 having played 2 matches.

References

1894 births
Essendon Football Club players
Australian rules footballers from Victoria (Australia)
1963 deaths